Kevin Michael Brindle,  (born 27 August 1955) is a British biochemist, currently Professor of Biomedical Magnetic Resonance in the Department of Biochemistry at the University of Cambridge and a Senior Group Leader at Cancer Research UK. He is known for developing magnetic resonance imaging (MRI) techniques for use in cell biochemistry and new imaging methods for early detection, monitoring, and treatment of cancer.

Early life and career 

Brindle took his BA in Biochemistry at Oxford University in 1978, before earning a D.Phil in 1982. He became a Royal Society University Research Fellow, also at Oxford, in 1986. Four years later, he took up a lectureship at Manchester University. He came a lecturer at Cambridge in 1993 and has been a professor there since 2005.

Research interests 

Brindle's research focuses on the use and development of new kinds of magnetic resonance imaging for investigating the biochemistry of cells, most recently in the early detection, monitoring of progression, and treatment of tumours. He has developed and patented a novel imaging agent for detecting cell death. He has also worked on the development of hyperpolarized carbon-13 MRI in cancer treatment, which involves injecting a carbon-13-labelled molecule into a tumour and using MRI to monitor how quickly it is growing or dying following drug treatment. Brindle estimates the technique to be between 10,000 and 100,000 times more sensitive than conventional techniques such as magnetic resonance spectroscopy and magnetic resonance spectroscopic imaging, and its main advantage is that it can show whether cancer drugs are working within days rather than weeks or months. It has been tested on numerous different types of cancer, including lung, brain, oesophageal, and breast cancers.

Awards 

Brindle has received numerous awards and recognition for his work, including the European Society for Molecular Imaging (ESMI) Award in 2013 and the Gold Medal of the World Molecular Imaging Society the following year. He was elected a Fellow of the Academy of Medical Sciences in 2012, to the European Academy of Cancer Sciences in 2014, and became a Fellow of the Royal Society in 2020. He served as President of the European Society for Molecular Imaging from 2018 to 2019. Brindle holds three patents on medical imaging.

Selected publications

See also 
 Hyperpolarized carbon-13 MRI
 Dynamic nuclear polarization
 Magnetic resonance imaging

References

External links
 

1955 births
Living people
Alumni of the University of Oxford
Academics of the University of Cambridge
British biochemists
Fellows of the Royal Society
Fellows of the Academy of Medical Sciences (United Kingdom)